The Catholic Church in Gabon is part of the worldwide Catholic Church, under the spiritual leadership of the Pope in Rome. It is endowed with the right to elect its own clergy, except archbishops.

There are over 600,000 Catholics in Gabon - almost half the population divided in five major congregations. There are five dioceses including one archdiocese, plus an apostolic vicariate.

History

The Catholic Church had its big first French missionary in Gabon Jean- Rémi Bessieux, from the Congregation of the Holy Spirit in the first half of the 19th century. In 1863 was born the Apostolic vicariate of Gabon, then called from the Two Guineas. Only after the 1878 began the evangelization of the hinterland. In 1958 Gabon becomes an Ecclesiastical province, with an autonomous Metropolitan see in Libreville, in 1899 the first priest was ordained in Gabon, and in 1961 was ordered the first bishop. In 1982 the Catholic Church received a pastoral visit of Pope John Paul II.

On December 12, 1997 Holy See and the Republic of Gabon signed an agreeing on the principles and some legal provisions concerning their relationship and their collaboration.

Ecclesiastical organization

The Catholic Church is present in Gabon with one ecclesiastical province, four suffragan dioceses and one apostolic prefecture:

 Archdiocese of Libreville
 Diocese of Franceville
 Diocese of Mouila
 Diocese of Oyem
 Diocese of Port-Gentil
 Apostolic Vicariate of Makokou

Statistics

At the end of 2013 the Catholic Church in Gabon counted:

 82 parishes;
 188 priests;
 2 permanent deacons;
 175 religious sisters;
 139 religious brothers;
 245 schools;
 18 charities.

The Catholic population amounted to 822,930 adherents, equal to 51.08 % of a total national population of 1,611,200.

References

External links
http://www.gcatholic.org/dioceses/country/GA.htm
http://www.catholic-hierarchy.org/country/ga.html
https://web.archive.org/web/20120713090802/http://www.eglisecatholique.ga/fr/index.php

 
Gabon
Gabon